President Aliyev may refer to:

 Heydar Aliyev (1923–2003), 3rd president of Azerbaijan
 Ilham Aliyev (born 1961), 4th president of Azerbaijan and son of the 3rd president

See also 

 Aliyev

Title and name disambiguation pages